The 1925 International Lawn Tennis Challenge was the 20th edition of what is now known as the Davis Cup. Sixteen teams would enter the Europe Zone, while 9 would enter the America Zone. Chile, Portugal, Poland and Sweden competed for the first time.

France defeated Australia in the Inter-Zonal play-off, but would fall to the United States in the Challenge Round. The final was played at the Germantown Cricket Club in Philadelphia, Pennsylvania, United States on 11–13 September.

America Zone

Draw

Final
Australia vs. Japan

Europe Zone

Draw

Final
Netherlands vs. France

Inter-Zonal Final
France vs. Australia

Challenge Round
United States vs. France

See also
 1925 Wightman Cup

References

External links
Davis Cup official website

Davis Cups by year
 
International Lawn Tennis Challenge
International Lawn Tennis Challenge
International Lawn Tennis Challenge